Valar Ventures is a US-based venture capital fund founded by Andrew McCormack, James Fitzgerald and Peter Thiel. Historically, the majority of the firm's investments have been in technology startups based outside of Silicon Valley, including in Europe, the UK, the US and Canada. Valar Ventures originally spun out of Thiel Capital, Peter Thiel's global parent company based in San Francisco, and is now headquartered near Madison Square in Manhattan. The firm's namesake is the Valar of J. R. R. Tolkien's legendarium, who are god-like immortal spirits that chose to enter the mortal world to prepare it for their living creations.

Andrew McCormack and James Fitzgerald are the managing partners of the firm.

Investments
Valar was notably the first venture fund to invest in Xero. The fund made its initial investment in Xero in October 2010 at a valuation of approximately $98 million. Since then, the firm has spearheaded successive rounds of investment in the company and Xero's market cap has grown to more than $4 billion as of February 2014.

Valar also led TransferWise's Series A and Series B financing rounds in January 2013 and April 2014, respectively. Following Valar's investment, Andreessen Horowitz led TransferWise's Series C and Baillie Gifford led the company's Series D in 2016 at a $1.1 billion valuation.

Both Xero and TransferWise were investments out of Valar's $100M first fund, which was a series of special purpose vehicles, including a $32 million New Zealand specific fund. Additional investments in startups include: Breather, N26 (€10 million in a 2016 series A round), Descomplica, Dinda, Even, EyeEm, Granify, Homie, Lystable, Oppa, fintech Stash, TradeIt, and Vend. In 2018, Valar led Series A funding for Petal, a fintech start up and led a second round of funding for Coya, a German insurance startup.

In February 2019, Valar Ventures led a $28 million Series B funding round for Cluno, a mobility and fintech company based in Germany. Acton Capital Partners and Atlantic Labs, which both backed the company’s Series A round, also participated. Cluno is a digital car subscription provider that offers fixed monthly package pricing.

References

External links
 

Financial services companies established in 2012
Venture capital firms of the United States